The Norwegian Peace Film Award - NoPFA was founded December 2, 2003. The organizations represented at the inaugural meeting were the Centre for Peace Studies (CPS), the Students Network for Peace (SNF), and the Tromsø International Film Festival (TIFF).

Objectives
The NoPFA-Foundation will annually give The Norwegian Peace Film Award during the Tromsø International Film Festival to a film spotlighting direct, structural or cultural violence, and which in a creative way contributes to a deeper understanding of conflicts and violence. Through educational work and distribution of the award, the foundation wants to contribute to the promotion of a culture of peace both on local and international level.

The foundation is a non-profit organization and has no political affiliation.

Organization
The foundation is managed by a board consisting of six members. Each of the three founding organizations appoints two members. The board is responsible for the administration of the foundation, for its representation outwards, for the nomination of relevant films for the award, and for the appointment of the jury.

Winners
 2020 Made in Bangladesh, Rubaiyat Hossain, France/Bangladesh/Denmark/Portugal, Pyramide International
 2019 Blindspotting, Carlos López Estrada, USA, Non Stop Entertainment
 2018 A Man of Integrity, Mohammad Rasoulof, Iran, Arthaus
 2017 Hunting Plies, Izer Aliu, Norway/Macedonia, Europafilm
 2016 Democrates, Camilla Nielsson, Danmark, Det Danske Filminstitut
 2015 Drone, Tonje Hessen Schei, Norway, Tour de Force
 2014 Omar, Hany Abu-Assad, Palestine, The Match Factory
 2013 Wadja, Haifaa Al Mansour, Germany/Saudi Arabia, Arthaus
 2012 Play, Ruben ôstlund, Sweden, Arthaus
 2011: Hands Up (Romain Goupil, France)
 2010: The Other Bank (George Owashvili, Georgia/Kazakhstan)
 2009: Waltz with Bashir (Ari Folman, Israel)
 2008: Little Moth (Peng Tao, China)
 2007: The Cats of Mirikitani (Linda Hattendorf, USA)
 2006: Shooting Dogs (Michael Caton-Jones, UK)
 2005: Beautiful City (Asghar Farhadi, Iran)
 2004: In This World (Michael Winterbottom, UK)

References

External links
 

Norwegian film awards

de:Tromsø Internasjonale Filmfestival#Norwegischer Friedensfilmpreis